Ngô Đình Khôi (、1885–1945) was the eldest son of Ngô Đình Khả. He had eight younger siblings: five brothers, Ngô Đình Thục, Ngô Đình Diệm, Ngô Đình Nhu, Ngô Đình Cẩn, Ngô Đình Luyện; and three sisters, Giao, Hiệp, and Hoàng.

In 1930 he was promoted governor of Quảng Nam Province. His son Ngô Đình Huân served as secretary and interpreter for Yokoyama Masayuki, the director of the Japan Institute of Culture in Saigon, and later as Labor Inspector.

When Japanese forces overtook French Indochina in March 1941, Ngô Đình Khôi advised Emperor Bảo Đại not to abdicate, since he had possessed a number of weapons. His son Ngô Đình Huân also served as a liaison between the Huế court and the imperial court. The Japanese assumed that he was attempting to use force against the Viet Minh. In the fall of 1945, he and Ngô Đình Huân were arrested by the Viet Minh along with Phạm Quỳnh. The Viet Minh cadres scolded and beat him and said that he would die with his father. Both were later buried alive.

References 
 

 

Ngo family
Nguyen dynasty officials
Government ministers of Vietnam
Vietnamese anti-communists
1885 births
1945 deaths
Deaths by live burial